Hecabe can refer to:
 Hecabe, Latin Hecuba, a Trojan queen, wife of Priam and mother of Hector
 Hecabe, one of the Danaïdes, who married and murdered Dryas
 An orchid related to the genus Phaius